Ighermia was a monotypic genus of flowering plants in the daisy family. It had only one species, Ighermia pinifolia  It was first published in Nordic J. Bot. Vol.3 on page 445 in 1983.

The genus name of Ighermia is derived from "Ighermi", a Berber name of this plant.

This is now classed as a synonym of Asteriscus

References

Monotypic Asteraceae genera
Inuleae
Historically recognized angiosperm genera